The Hunter is a 2011 Russian drama film directed by Bakur Bakuradze. It premiered in the Un Certain Regard section at the 2011 Cannes Film Festival.

Cast
 Gera Avdochenok as Kolya
 Mikhail Barskovich as Ivan Dunaev
 Vladimir Degilev as Viktor
 Oksana Semenova as Wife
 Tatyana Shapovalova as Lyuba

References

External links

2011 films
2011 drama films
2010s Russian-language films
Russian drama films